Yevgeny Maksimovich Frolov (born 2 January 1997) is a Russian football player.

He made his debut in the Russian Football National League for FC Baltika Kaliningrad on 25 November 2015 in a game against FC Luch-Energiya Vladivostok.

References

External links
 Profile by Russian Football National League

1997 births
Sportspeople from Kaliningrad
Living people
Russian footballers
FC Baltika Kaliningrad players
Association football midfielders